Rachel, Countess d'Avigdor (19 September 1816 – 5 November 1896) was an English Jewish philanthropist and communal worker.

Rachel was the second daughter of Isabel and Sir Isaac Lyon Goldsmid, and sister of Anna Maria, Frederick, and Francis Goldsmid. She was privately educated by some of the most eminent teachers of the time, including Thomas Campbell, the poet. Shortly after their marriage, the Count and Countess d'Avigdor went to London, where were born their three sons and one daughter. Her husband, from whom she eventually separated, returned to Paris, and became a personal friend of Napoleon III, who conferred upon him the title of Duke of Acquaviva.

The Countess took a deep interest in the communal institutions of the English metropolis. She was at one time president of the Ladies' Committee of the Jews' Deaf and Dumb Home and honorary secretary of the West End Charity, as well as a member of the committees of the Jewish Convalescent Home, of the workhouse committee of the Jewish Board of Guardians, and of the West End Sabbath School. Both the Bayswater Jewish Schools and the Jews' Deaf and Dumb Home owed their inception principally to her advocacy. She was also a signatory of the first mass Votes for Women petition in Britain in 1866.

Publications

See also
 Goldsmid family

References
 

1816 births
1896 deaths
Burials at Balls Pond Road Cemetery
British countesses
Jewish British philanthropists
Jewish women philanthropists
Philanthropists from London
Goldsmid family